Judo at the 1990 Commonwealth Games was the second time (but first official time) that Judo at the Commonwealth Games was included as a sport. It had been held as a demonstration sport four years earlier at the 1986 Commonwealth Games. The sport took place in the East Pavilion at the Auckland Expo Center, with the flooring only just completed in time for competition.

Results

References

1990 Commonwealth Games events
1990 in judo
1990
Judo in New Zealand